Esa Tapani (born 1968) is a Finnish horn player. A member of the Finnish Radio Symphony Orchestra, he served as the soloist at its recording of Magnus Lindberg's Campana in aria.

References

 Musicfinland.com

Finnish classical horn players
Living people
1968 births